Hrot is a first-person shooter video game developed by Spytihněv. It is primarily inspired by Quake. The early access version was released on 29 January 2021, and included the first of three episodes.

Gameplay
Hrot is a retro-styled first-person shooter. Players explore and navigate to the exit of each level, facing monsters and finding secret areas along the way.  Usually, there are switches to activate or keys to collect in order to open doors before the exit can be reached. Reaching the exit takes the player to the next level.

The campaign is divided into three episodes. It is set in 1986 in an alternate reality Czechoslovakia which was struck by an unknown disaster. The first episode has 8 levels with a boss fight in every second level. Each level is set in a real location in Prague. This includes Vyšehrad or Vítkov Hill. The second episode, which was inspired by the Hussite era and Bohemian castles, released on 22 June 2022. The episode, titled The Degustation, features 8 levels and an additional secret level.

References

Alternate history video games
Dark fantasy video games
Dieselpunk
Early access video games
First-person shooters
Horror video games
Multiplayer and single-player video games
Retro-style video games
Science fantasy video games
Upcoming video games
Video games developed in the Czech Republic
Video games set in 1986
Video games set in the Czech Republic
Windows games
Windows-only games